Stewart Lynell Gordon is an American musician, teacher, writer, editor, composer, and impresario. Gordon is Professor of Keyboard Studies at the USC Thornton School of Music of the University of Southern California as well as the music faculty at the Claremont Graduate University.

As a student, Stewart Gordon studied with a number of prominent pedagogues and concert artists including Olga Samaroff, Walter Gieseking, Cecile Genhart, and Adele Marcus. As a performing pianist, Gordon toured extensively throughout Europe, Asia and the Americas. Gordon's commercially issued recordings include works by Beethoven, Schubert, Schumann, Chopin, Scriabin, Ellis Kohs, Luis de Frietas-Branco, and the complete Rachmaninoff Preludes, although almost all of these are long out of print and only obtainable secondhand. He is officially a Steinway Artist, and he serves on the board of directors of the Steinway Society of Riverside County.

His academic career has included posts at Wilmington College in Ohio, the University of Maryland, where he served as Dean of the Music School, and Queens College, City University of New York, where he served as a Provost and a Vice-President in the Academic Affairs department.

Recordings
Schubert Sonata Op. 143 and Schumann Sonata Op. 11. Washington Records, WR 425, 1965
The Complete Preludes of Rachmaninoff, Vol. I, Op. 23 and Op. 3. Washington Records, WR 426, 1967
The Complete Preludes of Rachmaninoff, Vol. II Op. 32 and 2 early preludes. Washington Records 427, 1966
Schubert German Dances, Washington Records, WR 441, 1968
Stewart Gordon Plays Piano Favorites Beethoven, Scriabin, Debussy, DeFalla. Reformation Records, RR1011, 1968
The Preludes of Freitas-Branco. Gulbenkian Foundation, 1971

Composer
As a composer Gordon has primarily channeled his efforts into musical theater, and his shows have been successfully produced in New York City, Washington, D.C., Savannah, Hollywood, and Hawaii. His musical Libby generated renewed national interest in the historic cabaret performer Libby Holman. Earlier in his career he also wrote the music for the historic pageant "Spirit of the Navy", a project initiated by the Chief of Naval Operations to celebrate the US Navy's 200th birthday. He is involved with book writer Robert Weller in creating a new musical based on the history of Palm Springs, California.

Competitions
He founded the William Kapell International Piano Competition and acted as its director for 15 years. In New York City he founded the Cultural Heritage Competition and the Great Gospel Competition. He is a past President of the Virginia Waring International Piano Competition, and holds the title of Director of International Outreach.  In Savannah, Georgia, he founded the Savannah Onstage Music Festivals, as well as its American Traditions Competition, and acted as their artistic director for 14 years. He has served as an adjudicator for many international competitions, including the Gina Bachauer, William Kapell, Rosa Ponselle, Virginia Waring and the finals of the Canadian Music Competitions, and Music Teachers National Competitions at the regional and national levels.

Entrepreneurial projects
1967– 1985 Founder and Director of University of Maryland International Piano Festival and William Kapell International Piano Competition
1986–1988 Established the Cultural Heritage Competitions in New York City, a competitive festival event for pre-college students featuring special categories of literature: European, Black, Latin, Jewish, East European (piano, strings, winds, voice).
1988–2002 Founder and Director of the Savannah Onstage music festival and the American Traditions Competition

Music
Music through midi Dennis Alexander and Dennis Thurmond, 36 teaching pieces in three volumes for digital keyboard programmed to general midi, Alfred Music Publications, Van Nuys, California, 1994

Publications
The Well Tempered Keyboard Teacher, Schirmer Books, New York: First edition, 1991, co-authors Marienne Uszler and Elyse Mach; Second Edition, 2000, co-authors Marienne Uszler and Scott McBride Smith.
Etudes for Piano Teachers, Reflections on the Teacher’s Art, Oxford University Press, New York; Hardcover edition, 1995 paperback edition, 2001.
A History of Keyboard Literature for the Piano and its Forerunners], Schirmer Books, New York; Hardcover edition 1996; paperback edition, 2002.
Mastering the Art of Performance, Oxford University Press, New York, 2005

External links
University of Southern California
Etudes for Piano Teachers: Reflections on the Teacher's Art
Personal Webpage

American classical pianists
American male classical pianists
University of Maryland, College Park faculty
USC Thornton School of Music faculty
Queens College, City University of New York faculty
1930 births
Living people
Wilmington College (Ohio)
Place of birth missing (living people)
Musicians from Kansas
20th-century American pianists
21st-century classical pianists
20th-century American male musicians
21st-century American male musicians
21st-century American pianists